Rancho Santiago de Santa Ana was a  Spanish land concession in present-day Orange County, California, given by Spanish Alta California Governor José Joaquín de Arrillaga in 1810 to Jose Antonio Yorba and his nephew Pablo Peralta.

The lands encompass present-day Santa Ana, Orange, Villa Park, Anaheim Hills,  El Modena, Tustin, Costa Mesa, and a part of Irvine, which was formerly known as Rancho Lomas de Santiago and was titled to one of the Yorbas.

History

Juan Pablo Grijalva, a Spanish soldier who traveled to Alta California with the De Anza expedition, was the original petitioner for the lands that became known as the "Rancho Santiago de Santa Ana". He died before the grant was approved and the lands went to his son-in-law, José Antonio Yorba and his grandson, Juan Pablo Peralta. On July 1, 1810, the land later named Rancho Santiago de Santa Ana was granted to José Antonio Yorba and his nephew Pablo Peralta by Governor José Joaquín de Arrillaga on behalf of the Spanish Government. This was the only land grant in present-day Orange County given under Spanish Rule which were rare during this time. This was only two and a half months before the start of the war for Mexican Independence (1810–1821). The surrounding land grants or ranchos were granted by the Mexican government after Mexican independence in 1821.

The lands encroached upon the village of Puhú, shared by the Tongva, Acjachemen, Payómkawichum, and Serrano, that had been established long before the arrival of the Spanish. In 1832, the village people were massacred after a raid of American and Mexican fur trappers led by William Wolfskill.

José Antonio Yorba built an elaborate adobe hacienda, El Refugio (the Refuge), located near present-day First and Sullivan Streets in western Santa Ana.

With the Mexican Cession of California to the United States following the Mexican–American War, the 1848 Treaty of Guadalupe Hidalgo provided that the land grants would be honored.  As required by the Land Act of 1851, a claim for Rancho Santiago de Santa Ana was filed with the Public Land Commission in 1852, and the grant was patented to Bernardo, Teodoro and Ramón Yorba in 1883.

In 1854, the Yorba family sold Rancho Santiago de Santa Ana to José Antonio Andrés Sepúlveda.  Sepúlveda later lost the land due to bankruptcy caused by fighting to uphold his land claims in court. In 1869, William Spurgeon and Ward Bradford purchased  of the ranch to form the city of Santa Ana. It became the seat of government for the County in 1889.

The ranch further disintegrated with purchases by James Irvine, and James McFadden who built the McFadden Wharf in 1888.

Present day

Modern use of the Santiago name
 Casa de Santiago (neighborhood), Santa Ana, California
 Rancho Santiago Community College District, Santa Ana
 Santiago Park, Santa Ana
 Santiago Street, Santa Ana
 Santiago Canyon, Silverado, California
 Santiago Canyon College, Orange, California – RSCCD
 Santiago Canyon Trail, Orange, CA – Corona, California
 Santiago Communities
 Santiago Corporation
 Santiago Creek, Orange – Santa Ana
 Santiago High School, Garden Grove, California
 Santiago Hills (neighborhood) Orange, California
 Santiago Hills Elementary, Irvine, California
 Santiago Hills Park, Orange
 Santiago Oaks Regional Park, Orange
 Santiago Peak, Santa Ana Mountains
 Santiago Strings, a Pacific Symphony youth ensemble

Historic sites of the Rancho

Diego Sepúlveda Adobe

Modern development of the Rancho
Besides Santa Ana, other cities and unincorporated communities formed on the old Rancho Santiago de Santa Ana are El Modena, Santa Ana Heights, Orange, Costa Mesa, Tustin, and Olive.

The Rancho Santiago Community College District is located in Santa Ana and is composed of Santa Ana College and Santiago Canyon College in Orange.

Notes

References
Beers, Henry Putney, (1979). "Spanish & Mexican Records of the American Southwest : A Bibliographical Guide to Archive and Manuscript Sources", Tucson : University of Arizona Press
Davila, Amelia L.,  (1893). "Historic Yorba", Santa Ana Weekly Blade
Dominguez, Arnold O., (1985). "José Antonio Yorba I", 2nd Ed., Orange County Historical Society
Pleasants, Adelene (1931). "History of Orange County, California. Vol. 1", Los Angeles, CA : J. R. Finnell & Sons Publishing Company

Related links
City of Santa Ana Public Library
Santa Ana Historical Preservation Society
City of Santa Ana
Don Juan Pablo Grijalva: Anza expedition to what is now Orange County

Santiago de Santa Ana
Santiago de Santa Ana
Santa Ana River
1810 in Alta California
1810 establishments in Alta California
Costa Mesa, California
Orange, California
History of Santa Ana, California
Tustin, California
Geography of Santa Ana, California